The classical Milanese orthography is the orthography used for the Western Lombard language, in particular for the Milanese dialect, by the major poets and writers of this literature, such as Carlo Porta, Carlo Maria Maggi, Delio Tessa, etc. 
It was first used in the sixteenth century by Carlo Maria Maggi; Maggi first introduced the trigram oeu, while previous authors, like Bonvesin de la Riva (thirteenth century), used Latinizing orthographies. In 1606 G. A. Biffi with his Prissian de Milan de la parnonzia milanesa began the first codification, incorporating vowel length and the use of ou to represent the sound . 
The classical orthography came as a compromise between the old Tuscan system and the French one; the characteristic that considerably differentiates this orthography from the effective pronunciation is the method for the distinction of long and short vowels. As of today, because it has become more archaic, it is often replaced by simpler methods that use signs ö, ü for front rounded vowels and the redoubling of vowels for long vowels. The classical orthography was regularized in the 1990s by the Circolo Filologico Milanese for modern use. 

The classical Milanese orthography (as edited by Circolo Filologico Milanese) has the following conventions that differ from Italian alphabet.

General use of accents:
acute accent: indicates a closed sound in e or o (  and   respectively, as in Italian)
grave accent: indicates an open sound in e or o (  and   respectively, as in Italian)
circumflex accent: indicates a stressed short o when otherwise would be unstressed (the circumflex is not used in Italian)

Pronunciation of vowels and false diphthongs:
 represents 
 represents 
 represents ; may also represent  after  or in the diphthong .

Use of consonants:
doubling: makes the preceding vowel short and open
 represents either a voiced or voiceless sibilant; intervocalically, it is always voiced, and voiceless  is represented with a double .  Word-finally, it is always voiceless.
 represents historical  or 
 after a vowel and followed by consonant (or word-final) represents the nasalization of the preceding vowel; before another vowel or when written doubled, it represents .
 represents the nasalization of the preceding vowel when followed by consonant or word-final; otherwise it represents .
 represents 
 represents 
 represents //

Table of pronunciation 
The stress is normally on the penultimate syllable for words ending in vowel, on the last syllable for these ending in consonant.

References 

Western Lombard language
Indo-European Latin-script orthographies